Vladimir Smirnov (born 28 February 1946) is a former international speedway rider from the Soviet Union.

Speedway career 
Smirnov won a bronze medal at the Speedway World Team Cup in the 1969 Speedway World Team Cup. Two years later he won a silver medal in the 1971 Speedway World Team Cup.

World final appearances

World Team Cup
 1969 -  Rybnik, Rybnik Municipal Stadium (with Gennady Kurilenko / Viktor Trofimov / Valeri Klementiev / Yury Dubinin) - 3rd - 23pts (9)
 1971 -  Wroclaw, Olympic Stadium (with Grigory Khlinovsky / Vladimir Gordeev / Viktor Trofimov / Anatoly Kuzmin) - 2nd - 22pts (7)

Ice World Championship
1975 –  Moscow, 5th – 22pts
1976 –  Assen, 13th – 8pts

References 

1946 births
Russian speedway riders
Living people